Athletes from the Kingdom of Serbs, Croats and Slovenes competed at the 1928 Summer Olympics in Amsterdam, Netherlands. 34 competitors, all men, took part in 21 events in 6 sports.

Medalists

Athletics

Men's 1500m
Luka Predanić

Men's marathon
Dimitrije Stefanović

Men's javelin throw
Vilim Messner

Men's decathlon
Branko Kallay

Cycling

Four cyclists, all men, represented Yugoslavia in 1928.

Men's individual and team road race
Josip Šolar
Stjepan Ljubić
Josip Škrabl
Antun Banek

Fencing

Two fencers, both men, represented Yugoslavia in 1928.

Men's foil
 Ðuro Freund

Men's sabre
 Franjo Fröhlich

Football

Men's tournament
Danko Premerl
Franjo Giler
Geza Šifliš
Ljubiša Ðorđević
Kuzman Sotirović
Ivica Bek
Mikica Arsenijević
Milutin Ivković
Mirko Bonačić
Slavin Cindrić
Mića Mitrović

Gymnastics

Wrestling

References

External links
Official Olympic Reports
International Olympic Committee results database

Nations at the 1928 Summer Olympics
1928
Summer Olympics